Henk Krediet (born 22 July 1942) is a Dutch modern pentathlete. He competed at the 1972 Summer Olympics.

References

1942 births
Living people
Dutch male modern pentathletes
Olympic modern pentathletes of the Netherlands
Modern pentathletes at the 1972 Summer Olympics
Sportspeople from Friesland
People from Sneek